Jerson is a given name. Notable people with the name include:

Jerson Cabral (born 1991), Dutch footballer
Jerson Monteiro (born 1985), professional soccer player
Jerson Ravelo (born 1977), boxer from the Dominican Republic
Jerson Ribeiro (born 1988), Dutch footballer of Cape Verdian descent offensive midfielder
Jerson Tegete (born 1988), Tanzanian footballer